Supna Syed Zaidi (also spelled Sapna Syed Zaidi) is a Pakistani born American journalist, lawyer, director of the Council for Democracy and Tolerance, assistant director of Islamist Watch at the Middle East Forum, and editor-in-chief of Muslim World Today and Pakistan Today. She is the deputy director of the Children's Rights Institute.

In 1999, Zaidi received a B.A. in political theory and a B.A. in history of the Near East and Religion from the University of California, San Diego. In May 2003, she received a J.D. from New York Law School. After graduation from law school, Zaidi practiced family, deportation and asylum immigration law in New York and New Jersey.

In 2008, Supna Zaidi was appointed Assistant Director of Islamist Watch.

Zaidi is the daughter of Tashbih Sayyed, a Pakistani Muslim journalist and general manager of Pakistan Television.

Publications
 Supna Zaidi. Exporting American anti-Americanism to Muslim world. The Washington Examiner. October 28, 2009
 Supna Zaidi. Does Islam Justify Honor Killings? Pajamas Media. September 27, 2008
 Supna Zaidi. The United Islamist Nations. American Spectator. December 4, 2008
 Supna Zaidi. Lawful Islamism's Greatest Attack Yet. Muslim World Today. October 10, 2008
 Supna Zaidi. Sharia Is Hate. Front Page Magazine. 2008

References

Living people
Pakistani women journalists
Pakistani lawyers
Pakistani women lawyers
American women journalists
American women lawyers
Pakistani emigrants to the United States
University of California, San Diego alumni
New York Law School alumni
Year of birth missing (living people)
21st-century American women